Gifa Palermo is an amateur Italian multi-sports club from Palermo, founded in 1979 with major activities in the areas of diving and water polo. Currently its main activities are the women's water polo team and a center for start swimming and water polo. In 2004, the company was awarded the Bronze Star CONI. The president of the club is Fabio Gioia.

Water polo team 
Eight years after the founding of the club, in 1987, a group of ex-swimmers chose the sports club to found a women's water polo team, in 1989 after two seasons in the lower divisions, Gifa arrived in A1, a category in which it played uninterruptedly since then, getting even six second places. In the prize list of the team include two LEN trophies, won in 1999-00 and in 2001-02. The team colors are pink and black. Currently the team plays in the championship serie A2.

Honours 

Women's LEN Trophy
 Winners (2): 1999-00, 2001–02

External links 
 Official site

References 

Water polo clubs in Italy
Sport in Palermo
Sports clubs established in 1979